Jay Douglas is a Canadian musician, based in Toronto.  He is a long-time member of the Toronto music scene.

Early life
Douglas was born in Jamaica. Douglas spent his childhood in Montego Bay, Jamaica, where he first performed. He moved to Toronto, Ontario to join his mother in 1963 when he was a teenager.

Career
According to a 2012 profile in Now magazine, Douglas' first Canadian performances were at Toronto's Central Technical School, when he was a student there.

His first professional group was The Cougars, a funk band.

Since then, Douglas has performed steadily at clubs and festivals all over Ontario.  He has performed at Toronto's Massey Hall, Roy Thompson Hall, and the Glenn Gould Studio. In 2012 his album Lovers' Paradise was one of that year's five Juno nominees for best reggae album.

Now described Douglas as a "treasure trove of Toronto-Jamaican musical history".

In 2012, Seattle-based Light in the Attic Records produced a retrospective on the arrival of reggae to North America that relied heavily on Douglas's performances, knowledge, and contacts. Matt Sullivan, a producer with Light in the Attic, called Douglas "one of the finest soul-reggae singers in North America". Errol Nazareth, writing in the Toronto Sun called it ironic that it required producers from Seattle to fully recognize the significance of Douglas's musical contributions.

On September 19, 2015, Douglas debuted a song entitled "Reggae Lane" at a concert to celebrate the completion of a  mural celebrating the history of reggae at the recently renamed Reggae Lane.

Douglas was shortlisted for the 2020 Juno Awards, for Reggae Recording of the Year, for "Jah Children".

References

Black Canadian musicians
Canadian reggae musicians
Jamaican emigrants to Canada
Musicians from Toronto